Iraq has a number of environmental issues.

Issues

Oil spills 
Numerous spills have resulted from damage to Iraq’s oil infrastructure, and the lack of water treatment facilities at Iraqi refineries has led to pollution from those installations. This has many concerns for the population of Iraq.

Sanitation 

Because of infrastructure damage, significant parts of the population do not have adequate water supply or sanitation systems.

Unexploded ordnance 
Military operations in three wars (Iran–Iraq War, Gulf War, and Iraq War) have left unexploded ordnance and land mines in exposed positions, killing or wounding an estimated 100,000 people in the early 2000s.

Pollution 
Sites where municipal and medical wastes have accumulated carry the risk of disease epidemics. The wartime destruction of military and industrial infrastructure has released heavy metals and other hazardous substances into the air, soil, and groundwater.

In June 2003, a fire at the Al-Mishraq state run sulfur plant near Mosul burned for 3 weeks and was the largest human-made release of sulfur dioxide ever recorded.

As of 2017, Iraq was one of only 3 countries in the world with widespread use of leaded engine gasoline for automobiles, the others being Algeria and Yemen. Concerns over the toxicity of lead led to a ban on leaded automobile gasoline in most countries.

Land degradation 

In the alluvial plain, soil quality has been damaged by the deposit of large amounts of salts, borne by irrigation overflows and wind and promoted by poor soil drainage. Desertification and erosion also have reduced arable land.

River basins 

Transboundary pollution and a lack of river basin management by the government have led to the degradation of Iraq's major waterways. Under Saddam Hussein, the government constructed the Glory Canal which drained the extensive marshes in the lower reaches of the alluvial plain, changing water circulation and wildlife patterns over a wide area. Beginning in 2004, some restoration has occurred.

According to a 2001 United Nations Environmental Programme report, the projects resulted in:
 The loss of a migration area for birds migrating from Eurasia to Africa, and consequent decrease in bird populations in areas such as the Ukraine and the Caucasus.
 Probable extinction of several plant and animal species endemic to the Marshes.
 Higher soil salinity in the Marshes and adjacent areas, resulting in loss of dairy production, fishing, and rice cultivation.
 Saltwater intrusion and increased flow of pollutants into the Shatt-al-Arab waterway, causing disruption of fisheries in the Persian Gulf.

Government response 
Although the interim government appointed in 2004 included a Ministry of Environment, long-term environmental crises such as the depletion of marshland in the Shatt al Arab have a low priority. The government has made numerous efforts to help the environment and the people of Iraq.

See also
Nature Iraq, Iraq's first and only conservation group
 Humat Dijla, an iraqi association that works for a better awareness about the water problem in Iraq.

References

External links 
A collection of articles, studies and reports relating to Iraq's environment